USS Chinook has been the name of more than one United States Navy ship, and may refer to:

 , a patrol vessel in commission from 1917 to 1918
 , a patrol vessel in commission since 1995

United States Navy ship names